The 2018 Girabola was the 40th season of top-tier football in Angola. The season ran from 10 February to 2 September 2018.

The league comprised 16 teams, the bottom three of which were relegated to the 2019 Provincial stages.

Primeiro de Agosto won their third title in a row, qualifying to the 2018–19 CAF Champions League.

On an exceptional basis, on account of the Angola Cup not being contested this season, Petro de Luanda, the runner up, qualified to the 2018–19 CAF Confederation Cup.

Teams
A total of 16 teams contested the league, including 13 sides from the 2017 season and three promoted from the 2017 Segundona - Cuando Cubango FC, Domant FC and Sporting de Cabinda.

On the other hand, Progresso da Lunda Sul, ASA and Santa Rita de Cássia were the last three teams of the 2017 season and will play in their respective provincial leagues seeking qualification for the 2018 2nd division qualifiers. Clube Desportivo Primeiro de Agosto were the defending champions from the 2017 season.

Changes from 2017 season
Relegated: ASA, Progresso da Lunda Sul, Santa Rita de Cássia 
Promoted: Cuando Cubango FC, Domant FC, Sporting de Cabinda

J.G.M. withdrawal
In late April, J.G.M. submitted a withdrawal request to the Angolan Football Federation citing financial reasons. The request was granted. As a result, all points won in games against J.G.M. were withdrawn.

FIFA penalties
In May, FIFA has instructed the Angolan Football Federation that Kabuscorp should forfeit 6 points as a result of being in default to their former star player Rivaldo. In a weekly report issued by the Angolan federation, it is further stated that the club may be banned from official competition in case the claimant files a new complaint.

In June, FIFA again ruled that Kabuscorp forfeits 6 points in the League for being in default with TP Mazembe in the 2014 deal with DRC midfielder Trésor Mputu.

In July, FIFA ruled that Progresso Associação do Sambizanga forfeits 6 points in the League for being in default with Ghanaian striker Raphael Kwaku Obeng.

Stadiums and locations

League table

Results

Positions by round

Clubs season progress

Season statistics

Top scorers

Hat-tricks

References

External links
 Match schedule

Girabola seasons
Girabola
Angola